Marie Melita of Hohenlohe-Langenburg (Marie Melita Leopoldine Viktoria Feodora Alexandra Sophie; 18 January 1899 – 8 November 1967) was Duchess of Schleswig-Holstein as the wife of Wilhelm Friedrich, Duke of Schleswig-Holstein. She was the eldest daughter of Ernst II, Prince of Hohenlohe-Langenburg and his wife Princess Alexandra of Edinburgh.

Marriage and issue
Marie Melita married her second cousin, Wilhelm Friedrich, Hereditary Prince of Schleswig-Holstein-Sonderburg-Glücksburg, the only son of Friedrich Ferdinand, Duke of Schleswig-Holstein and his wife Princess Karoline Mathilde of Schleswig-Holstein-Sonderburg-Augustenburg, on 5 February 1916 at Coburg. Wilhelm Friedrich and Marie Melita had four children:

Hans Albrecht, Hereditary Prince of Schleswig-Holstein (12 May 1917 – 10 August 1944); unmarried, no issue
Prince Wilhelm Alfred Ferdinand of Schleswig-Holstein-Sonderburg-Glücksburg (24 September 1919 – 17 June 1926)
Friedrich Ernst Peter, Duke of Schleswig-Holstein (30 April 1922 – 30 September 1980); married with Princess Marie Alix of Schaumburg-Lippe, had issue
Princess Marie Alexandra of Schleswig-Holstein (9 July 1927 – 14 December 2000); married, on 22 July 1970 at Grünholz, Schleswig-Holstein, Germany, Douglas Barton-Miller (born 27 December 1929); no issue.

Ancestry

References

1899 births
1967 deaths
Marie Melita
Marie Melita
Marie Melita
People from Langenburg